"Love on the Rise" is a song by American singer Kashif and saxophonist Kenny G. The song appears on Kashif's third studio album Condition of the Heart and Kenny G's album Gravity and acts as both's lead single. The song was released in 1985.

Production
Kenny G and Kashif had worked together before the single was released, at the beginning of both of their careers. The song is a funk, post-disco song, with the alto saxophone section performed by Kenny G.

Music video
The music video for the song was released in 1985. In the music video, both Kenny G and Kashif are chasing the same woman, but in the end they find out the woman is with somebody else and they become friends.

Track listing

Charts

References

1985 songs
1985 singles
Kashif (musician) songs
Kenny G songs
Arista Records singles
Songs written by Wayne Brathwaite